The Stars From The Commitments is a nine-piece Dublin based soul band, featuring original cast members and musicians from the BAFTA Winner, Golden Globe & Oscar nominated Sir Alan Parker film The Commitments and multimillion selling sound track.

History of the band
The band was formed shortly after the release of the film, which itself was based on the Roddy Doyle novel of the same name. Since 1993 The Stars From The Commitments have toured extensively across Canada, USA, South America, Europe, Scandinavia, Africa, Asia and Australia.

Original Cast members: guitarist Kenneth McCluskey Aka Derek "The Meat Man" Scully, Piano Player Michael Aherne Aka "Steven The Soul Surgeon" Clifford, Ronan Dooney, Trumpet. The following members: Plus Myles Hyland (lead vocals), Andreas Nolan (bass), Sandra Hyland and Antoinette Dunleavy (lead & backing vocals), Abraham Hampton (keyboards & Organ) and Serge Stavila – Saxophone, joined later.
Their open air concert at the Party in the Park in São Paulo, Brazill were attended by over 100,000 people where they were performing with legendary blues guitarist and singer B. B. King. The soundtracks to the Alan Parker film such as In The Midnight Hour, Try a Little Tenderness and Mustang Sally have sold over 12 million copies.

The original members of the group Dick Massey and Kenneth McCluskey have formed their own band called "The Commitments".

After the film's success Andrew Strong, the lead singer, performed with Elton John, Bryan Adams, Ray Charles and The Rolling Stones, and signed a solo record deal with MCA Records. He continued touring and lives in Denmark.

Discography

See also
The Commitments

References

External links
 Official website

Musicians from Dublin (city)